An agadir (plural: igudar or iguidar, "the wall" or "the fortified compound") is a fortified communal granary found in the Maghreb. Some of these date back to the 10th century. These structures are typically composed of a granary and a citadel, and are located in rocky, elevated locations to protect surrounding farms and livestock from enemies. In addition to harvested grains, Amazigh communities inhabiting the mountainous south of Morocco would use these structures to store all kinds of valuable belongings, including deeds and records, money, jewelry, clothing, carpets, and sometimes clothes and munitions.

Name 
The term agadir is Amazigh, borrowed from  meaning "the wall", "the compound", or (by metonymy) "the stronghold". The word agadir is common in North African place names, such as Agadir, Morocco, and the cities Cádiz and Gedera are also etymologically related. The word al-Makhzen, used to refer to the Moroccan state apparatus, also means storehouse, but in Arabic.

References 

Berber
Buildings and structures in Morocco